Patriarch Athanasius of Antioch may refer to:

 Athanasius I Gammolo, Syriac Orthodox Patriarch of Antioch in 595–631
 Athanasius II Baldoyo, Syriac Orthodox Patriarch of Antioch in 683–686
 Athanasius II Dabbas, Greek Orthodox Patriarch of Antioch in 1611–1619
 Athanasius Sandalaya, Syriac Orthodox Patriarch of Antioch in 756–758
 Athanasius III Dabbas, Greek Orthodox Patriarch of Antioch in 1685–1694 and 1720–1724
 Athanasius IV of Salh, Syriac Orthodox Patriarch of Antioch in 986–1002
 Athanasius V Haya, Syriac Orthodox Patriarch of Antioch in 1058–1063
 Athanasius VI bar Khamoro, Syriac Orthodox Patriarch of Antioch in 1091–1129
 Athanasius VII bar Qutreh, Syriac Orthodox Patriarch of Antioch in 1138–1166
 Athanasius VIII, Syriac Orthodox Patriarch of Antioch in 1200–1207